IStar Cinema Co., Ltd. (아이스타 시네마) (also known as IStar Cinema, Inc. and iStar Cinema) is a Korean entertainment company founded in May 2005. IStar Cinema is affiliate of Yuri International.

Its business sectors are management of celebrities, producing films and drama, and producing original soundtracks.

Related companies
 Trifecta Entertainment

External links 

 IStar Cinema Official homepage (currently down)

Film production companies of South Korea